The Egyptian Wafd Alliance was an alliance of political parties that would have run in the 2015 Egyptian parliamentary election. The Egyptian Social Democratic Party left the alliance and will run independently. The Tagammu Party left the Wafd Alliance and will run for individual seats. The Justice Party announced on 15 February 2015 that it will not participate in the election. The New Wafd Party, Conservative Party and Reform and Development Party joined the For the Love of Egypt alliance.

Formerly affiliated parties
 New Wafd Party
 Reform and Development Misruna Party
 Conservative Party
 Consciousness Party
 Arab Alliance Party
 Arab Party for Justice and Equality
 Reform and Renaissance Party
 National Partnership Current
 Justice Party

References

2014 establishments in Egypt
Defunct political party alliances in Egypt
Organizations established in 2014